Lajtabánság, or the Banate of Leitha, was a short-lived western Hungarian state in the region where the Austrian federal state of Burgenland now exists. It existed between 4 October and 10 November 1921, following the Treaty of Trianon and the departure of the rump Kingdom of Hungary's army and after the Sopron plebiscite was held in the area according to the Venice protocol.

The principal leaders of the state were Pál Prónay, Count Gyula Ostenburg-Moravek and former Hungarian prime minister István Friedrich. Its military was the Rongyos Gárda ("Ragged Guards" or "Scrubby Guards"), recruited from former army soldiers, peasants and students devoted to retaining the region rather than surrender it to Austria.

Etymology
Lajta (or Leitha in German) refers to the Leitha River, which the region of Lajtabánság was East of. Leitha originated from Old High German , which was possibly derived from the Pannonian word for mud.  refers to the lands held by a Ban (regional administrator), a word generally seen to be borrowed from Turkic languages by Slavs and used in Hungary and Croatia.

Geography and People
Burgenland is a flat area, with some swamps and big settlements divided by large tracts of land. It was predominantly German, with the local Germans identifying themselves as Hungarians, known as Hungarus in German. In 1920, Burgenland was 75% Austrian German, 15% Croat, and 8% Hungarian, most of which were concentrated in the ethnic exclaves of Oberpullendorf and Oberwart. According to a 1918 census, Burgenland also had a 1.2% Jewish population.

According to the Austrians, Burgenland was historically, ethnically, and religiously Austrian German. The area was mostly Catholic, and German monks were important in shaping the culture and people of Burgenland. Geologist Hans Mohr of the technical college in Graz argued, in 1920, that:

Hungarian-born Austrian teacher Benno Immendörfer argued for the integration of Burgenland into Austria to secure Austria's supply of food, stating that:

However, according to Hungarians, there were no antecedents for an Austrian takeover and integration of Burgenland. It was argued that places in Burgenland like Kismarton/Eisenstadt and Fraknó/Forchenstein had been Hungarian royal domains for centuries. Burgenland had only been partly Germanized due to Austrian influence, and the original ancestors of its inhabitants were Hungarians, sent to protect the Hungarian borderlands. Until the Treaty of Trianon, Burgenland had been a part of Hungary.

History

After the Hungarian Soviet Republic
After the fall of the Hungarian Soviet Republic, Pál Prónay formed a small army of decommissioned officers and soldiers. These soldiers were responsible for the torture and execution of left-wing figures and people in the Hungarian capital, Budapest, as well as the Central Hungarian countryside (known as the White Terror) in response to the actions of the Lenin Boys led by Tibor Szamuely (known as the Red Terror). This band of soldiers was a predecessor of the Rongyos Gárda.

Soon, former admiral Miklós Horthy rose to the rank of Regent. The last King of Hungary IV. Karoly (Karl I of Austria) returned to Hungary and attempted to restore himself to the throne, but due to the ban on Habsburg restoration placed by the victorious Allied Powers, Horthy did not comply. Many Habsburg legitimists wanted his return, especially in Western Hungary, which would lead to the foundation of the Karlist faction in Lajtabánság.

Burgenland after the Treaty of Trianon

According to the Treaty of Trianon and the Treaty of Saint-Germain, several territories of Western Hungary were to be taken from the Kingdom of Hungary by Austria on 19 August 1921. In order to retain his position and power, Horthy was forced to accept the terms of the treaty. The Hungarian government hoped that they would be able to change the treaty and settle the hand-over by referendum, but their proposals were rejected by Austrian Chancellor Karl Renner multiple times. In January 1921, the Austrian National Assembly agreed to integrate the newly granted West Hungarian territory into Austria as Burgenland, a new federal state.

Creation of the Rongyos Gárda

The guard was organized (some sources say that it was organized in secret) and worked with the tacit consent of the Hungarian government. The insurgents were civilians, replacing military caps with a hood, the rim of which was fastened to the top of the hat with a cockade in the national colors of Hungary. The Rongyos Gárda consisted of peasants, college students, decommissioned military officers and Bosnian-Albanian Muslims who fought for the Kingdom of Hungary before Trianon (among them was Major Durics Hilmi Huszein, with nearly 300 associates). Young people from all over Hungary joined the Rongyos Gárda to fight for Western Hungary, but hardly any of them were actually from the region.

In 1921, Count Gyula Ostenburg-Moravek's hunter-battalion was stationed in Sopron. It was available to be controlled by the Entente committee in Sopron, helping them to control the evacuation and surrender of the area. Aside from this battalion, the Hungarian army did not have any presence in the territory.

West Hungarian Uprising

On August 28, an uprising started, with the  engaging in battle with the Austrian gendarmerie and a firefight starting at Ágfalva between the Austrians and 120 of Héjjas's men (the Great Plain Brigade). The Hungarian forces fought a guerrilla war against the Austrians, making it virtually impossible for Austria to take the territory. To the East of Sopron, there were rebels in every village. Former Prime Minister István Friedrich was involved, leading guerrillas at Kismarton (Eisenstadt).

Horthy appointed Gyula Gömbös as a regional commander in Western Hungary, with the task of regulating the Rongyos Gárda. However, both Héjjas and Friedrich refused to answer to Gömbös, retaining their autonomous actions. Prónay's main goal was to implement the Sigray-Lingauer Plan, formulated by Count Antal Sigray according to which, if the Hungarian government agreed with Austria in renouncing Western Hungary, the rebels would create an independent state called the Lajub. The title of Ban would have been given to Sigray or Archduke Albrecht Franz, Duke of Teschen. However, a referendum was in reach, so the Prime Minister dissuaded Sigray from his plan.

On 3 October 1921 Burgenland came under the de jure jurisdiction of the Entente (they had previously handed over control to the Austrians). On 4 October the Republic of Lajtabánság was declared in Felsőőr (Oberwart), which issued its own stamps and identification. Prónay's goal was now eventually rejoin Hungary after a plebiscite, writing in his memoirs that "In order to save Western Hungary, I have created an independent Lajtabánság." Trains between Austria and Hungary had to pay customs duties in the form of goods being taken off carriages. A total of 79 postage stamps and 6 postage due stamps were issued, which initially did not have watermarks. A Diocesan bishop also established a Vicariate in the area as the Dean of St. Michael at Güssing.

Downfall
The Republic of Lajtabánság was not permanent, and divides slowly started to show. A dispute started between the "free King-electors", who wanted to elect a monarch, which was the faction Prónay and Héjjas belonged to, and the Karlists, who supported the restoration of the Austrian Emperor and Hungarian King Karl I, which was the faction István Friedrich belonged to. Additionally, the Hungarian government also exerted pressure on Lajtabánság to avoid sanctions from the Allied Powers. The "Operetta-state" ended with the departure of the guerrillas on 10 November 1921, and the final engagement of the Austrian gendarmerie.

Previously, to solve the situation, on 11 and 12 October 1921, the Austrians began negotiations with Hungary in Venice. According to this agreement, the referendum must be held in Sopron, as well as 8 other villages as a condition for Lajtabánság to be dissolved. Prime Minister István Bethlen issued a letter to Sopron to order a withdrawal of the insurgents, which read:

The fate of Sopron and the surrounding areas were handled by referendum and Lajtabánság was dissolved.

Prónay later formed extremist right-wing organizations. On 20 March 1945 the Soviets captured him and took him away from Hungary. The place and time of his death are unknown.

Government
Felsőőr became the center and capital of Lajtabánság, as it had a majority Hungarian population. Lajtabánság's independence was declared before the Felsőőr church. Prónay became the leader of the revolt. Captain László Apáthy was appointed chairman of the board of governors and rapporteur on religious affairs, Ferenc Lévay was lecturer on foreign affairs and Justice Lieutenant, Captain Béla Bárdos was attorney-at-law, Lieutenant György Hir, member of the Hungarian National Assembly was lecturer on economic affairs. The government needed money, but there was little to hope for in tax collection, as the area declared self-sufficient was small and the rebels had already looted it. However, tax collectors paid a hefty price for stamps printed at printing houses in Pest.

Lajtabánság was not the first uprising in the region: previously, the 1918 Republic of Heinzenland and the 1919 Republic of Prekmurje were declared as independent countries by regional forces.

Legacy

Aside from stamps and 2 issues of an official journal, the Executive Council has left nothing behind. Some documents have been preserved in the Hungarian National Archives, some of which were partially destroyed in 1945. Prónay found about 15 letters of correspondence between Gyula Gömbös and the leading council of the Etelközi Szövetség. Some of these letters are in the Austrian State Archives, and the text is only preserved because of Prónay's transcripts of his memoirs.

In the Trianon Museum in Várpalota, Lajtabánság and Prónay have a room dedicated to them.

On 3 October 2010 supporters of the Hungarian party Jobbik held a commemorative ceremony for Lajtabánság in Oberwart, which was approved by the Austrian authorities, resulting in an inquiry from the Green MP Karl Öllinger in the Austrian National Council.

Further reading
 Béla Bodó: Pál Prónay: Paramilitary Violence and Anti-Semitism in Hungary, 1919–1921 (= The Carl Beck Papers. Nr. 2101). Center for Russian & East European Studies, University of Pittsburgh, March 2011, S. 31 ff.
 Béla Bodó: Iván Héjjas. In: East Central Europe. Band 37, Nr. 2–3, 2010, S. 247 ff.
 Józef Botlik: The Fate of Western Hungary 1918-1921. Buffalo o. J., S. 160 ff. (PDF) (Originaltitel: Nyugat-Magyarország sorsa 1918-1921. Vassilvágy, 2. Auflage 2008).
 Lászlo Fogarassy: Paul Prónays Erinnerungen an das „Lajta-Banat". In: Burgenländische Heimatblätter. 52. Jahrgang, Heft 1, Eisenstadt 1990, S. 1–10 (PDF) (deutsche Zusammenfassung seiner das Thema betreffenden Tagebucheintragungen).
 Andreas Moritsch: Vom Ethnos zur Nationalität: der nationale Differenzierungsprozess am Beispiel ausgewählter Orte in Kärnten und im Burgenland. Oldenbourg, München 1991, S. 110 f.
 Zsiga Tibor: Horthy ellen, a királyért
 Dr. Dabas Rezső: „Burgenland" álarc nélkül
 A határban a Halál kaszál... (Fejezetek Prónay Pál feljegyzéseiből)
 Magyar életrajzi lexikon
 A Rongyos Gárda harcai
 Az Erő útján
 A nyugat-magyarországi felkelés
 Somogyvári Gyula: És mégis élünk...
 Missuray-Krug Lajos: Tüzek a végeken

See also 
 Rongyos Gárda
 Burgenland
 Uprising in West Hungary

References

1921 disestablishments
1921 in Hungary
1921 in Austria
Burgenland
States and territories established in 1921
Leitha
Aftermath of World War I in Hungary
Aftermath of World War I in Austria
Former countries of the interwar period